"Cantar Hasta Morir" (English: "Sing until Die") is the lead single from Diego Torres's first live album (sixth overall) MTV Unplugged released on April 22, 2004.

Background and performance

The song is written and produced by himself along with Oney Alexander Cumba and Alexander Manuel Batista, also produced by Afo Verde who produced the album along him.

Music video
The music video is simply the live performance of the Unplugged, it shows him sitting, singing the song using a green sleeveless shirt and a leather pants. The live performance and the Unplugged were premiered on April 22, 2004 through MTV.

Charts

References

External links
"Cantar Hasta Morir" MTV Unplugged live performance
Diego Torres's official website

2004 singles
Diego Torres songs
Sony BMG Norte singles
2004 songs
Songs written by Diego Torres